Henry Cunningham (9 January 1898 – 17 September 1972), commonly known as Harry Cunningham and by the nickname Peerie, was a Scottish footballer who played as a forward, initially being deployed on the right wing or in a creative role but later recording a high scoring rate as a central striker. He spent his early years in junior football in Ayrshire before five seasons at Ayr United, then six at regional rivals Kilmarnock after Ayr were relegated from the top division in 1925.

Cunningham won the Scottish Cup with Kilmarnock in 1929 and set club records for top seasonal goalscorer in the Scottish Football League (34 from 35 appearances) and both major competitions (36 from 39), both in the 1927–28 season; the overall record was soon beaten in 1933 by his replacement in the Killie side, Bud Maxwell, while the league record was equalled by Andy Kerr in 1961 (playing one match fewer).

At representative level he played in an international trial during his time at Ayr United in 1924, but never received a full cap for Scotland.

References

1898 births
1972 deaths
Footballers from Irvine, North Ayrshire
Association football forwards
Scottish footballers
Irvine Meadow XI F.C. players
Kilmarnock F.C. players
Irvine Victoria F.C. players
Ayr United F.C. players
Cumnock Juniors F.C. players
Scottish Football League players
Scottish Junior Football Association players
Scotland junior international footballers